Susanne "Suse" Heinze (May 25, 1920 – November 26, 2018) was a German diver who competed in the 1936 Summer Olympics. She was born in Nuremberg. In 1936 she finished seventh in the 3 metre springboard event. Heinze died in November 2018 at the age of 98.

External links
 Suse Heinze's profile at Sports Reference.com

References

1920 births
2018 deaths
Divers at the 1936 Summer Olympics
German female divers
Olympic divers of Germany
Sportspeople from Nuremberg
20th-century German women